Odoardo Eugenio Giano Spadaro (16 January 1893 - 26 June 1965) was an Italian singer-songwriter and actor.

Early life
Spadaro was born in the quartiere of Santo Spirito in Florence, to Gustavo Spadaro and Mary Marchesini.

Career
He debuted on stage at seventeen years old and, taking the road into variety shows as a chansonnier, a fantasist and impersonator, he became an international celebrity when he replaced Maurice Chevalier at the Folies-Bergère in Paris.

In 1927 he was protagonist alongside Viviane Romance and Jean Gabin of a very successful variety show at the Moulin Rouge.

Regarded as the first great Italian singer-songwriter, Spadaro also wrote many successful songs dedicated to his home city in the 1930s and 40s including lyrics and music.; the best known of these being probably "Porta un bacione a Firenze" (Bring a Kiss to Florence).

Spadoro acted in several films, usually in supporting roles and appeared in The Golden Coach (La carrozza d'oro) with Anna Magnani in 1952. In 1953 he played Pinzi in Musoduro, a French-Italian drama film directed by Giuseppe Bennati in a cast led by Fausto Tozzi, Marina Vlady and Cosetta Greco. He was Baron Gaetano Cefalù in the 1961 comedy Divorce Italian Style. and appeared in Renato Castellani's Italian comedy-drama Mad Sea (Mare Matto) in 1963. The cast, headed by Gina Lollobrigida and Jean-Paul Belmondo, included Tomas Milian, himself, Noël Roquevert and Dominique Boschero.

Personal life
He and Clementina Lovisolo were married in 1924.

Death

Spodaro died on 26 June 1965 in his home town, Firenze, Toscana, Italy of unspecified causes. He was 72.

Selected filmography
 La carrozza d'oro (1952)
 Musoduro aka The Hunt (1953)
 Divorce Italian Style (1961)
 Mare Matto'' (1963)

References

1893 births
Italian male  singer-songwriters
Musicians from Florence
1965 deaths
Italian male film actors
Italian male stage actors
20th-century Italian male actors
20th-century Italian male  singers